The C. W. Woodworth Award is an annual award presented by the Pacific Branch of the Entomological Society of America. This award, the PBESA's largest, is for achievement in entomology in the Pacific region of the United States over the previous ten years. The award is named in honor of Charles W. Woodworth and was established on June 25, 1968. It is principally sponsored by Woodworth's great-grandson, Brian Holden, and his wife, Joann Wilfert, with additional support by Dr. Craig W. and Kathryn Holden, and Dr. Jim and Betty Woodworth.

Award recipients
Source:  Entomological Society of America

A box containing the older records of the PBESA and which likely contains the names of the first few recipients of the award is located in the special collections section of the library at U.C. Davis.

See also
 The John Henry Comstock Graduate Student Award
 List of biology awards

References

External links
 List of recipients from the PBESA
 PBESA agenda mentioning Dr. Nick Toscano as the 2007 winner
 Note about Dr. Jocelyn Millar winning the 2006 award
 Note about Dr. John Stark winning the 2005 award
 Biography of Dr. Robert S. Lane mentioning the 2001 award
 Article about Dr. Wyatt Cone winning the 1999 award (page 5)
 Note about Dr. Harry Kaya winning the 1998 award
 Note about Dr. Jackie Robertson winning the award
 Mention of the award in an article about a facility being named for Dr. Harry Laidlaw
 Dr. George P. Georghiou Obituary
 Note about Dr. William Wellington being the 11th winner of the award in 1979
 Dr. Carl Barton Huffaker Obituary
 Dr. William Harry Lange Jr. Obituary
 First page of Carl Barton Huffaker's acceptance speech mentioning Ray F. Smith

Entomological organizations
Biology awards
Awards established in 1969